The clearing of woods and forests is the process by which vegetation, such as trees and bushes, together with their roots are permanently removed. The main aim of this process is to clear areas of forest, woodland or scrub in order to use the soil for another purpose, such as pasture land, arable farming, human settlement or the construction of roads or railways.

Many of the world's most prominent forests have suffered significant levels of clearing in recent years, including the Amazon. In the 2 years following the presidential election of Jair Bolsonaro, clearing in eastern Brazil increased by 27%.

Indonesia has the highest rate of clearing and deforestation, with 15 million acres lost between 2000 and 2012. This was primarily due to the increase in demand for palm oil.

Description 
One definition of forest clearing is given in the Austrian federal law that governs the forestry industry which defines it as "the use of forest land for purposes other than forestry".

Sometimes a distinction is made between forest clearing or tree clearing, whereby the trees, including the stumps, are cleared, and stump or root clearing where the trees are first felled and the stumps removed subsequently.

Forest clearings may result in small, isolated, treeless areas or cleared corridors, for example along rivers or other linear features. Isolated clearings frequently occur in advance of more general and large-scale deforestation.

Many towns and villages in Central Europe emerged during historical "clearance periods" resulting in "clearing or clearance landscapes as a form of internal colonisation. An example of this is the settlement of people in the Central Uplands in so-called Waldhufendorf villages. The names of many towns and villages in Europe derives from their origin as clearance settlements, for example, names ending in -rode (Gernrode, Wernigerode) or -reuth (Bayreuth).

Unlike in other areas of the world, clearing in Europe has decreased in recent years. In the 25 years from 1990 to 2015, forested areas in Europe increased by 90,000 square kilometres (9 million hectares).

See also 
 History of the forest in Central Europe
Deforestation in Indonesia

References

Literature 
 Richard B. Hilf: Der Wald. Wald und Weidwerk in Geschichte und Gegenwart - Erster Teil [reprint]. Aula, Wiebelsheim, 2003, .
 Hans Hausrath: Geschichte des deutschen Waldbaus. Von seinen Anfängen bis 1850. Schriftenreihe des Instituts für Forstpolitik und Raumordnung der Universität Freiburg. Hochschulverlag, Freiburg im Breisgau, 1982, .
 Jens Lüning: Steinzeitliche Bauern in Deutschland. Die Landwirtschaft im Neolithikum, Habelt, Bonn, 2000, Universitätsforschungen zur prähistorischen Archäologie; Vol. 58, pp. 49–52

Forest management
Environmental history